Patrick Lavon Mahomes (born August 9, 1970) is an American former professional baseball pitcher.

Early life and amateur career
Mahomes was born in Texas, one of three children of Johnny and Cindy Mahomes. His father worked for a local oil company and coached Mahomes' youth baseball team. His mother worked as a nurse until Mahomes was seven years old and a car accident left her requiring the use of a wheelchair.

Mahomes attended Lindale High School in Lindale, Texas where he played baseball, football and basketball. He was an intense competitor and, according to his parents, would cry or refuse to eat or talk after every loss in high school. He was also a member of the National Honor Society and had the second-highest grade point average in his graduating class.

Mahomes was only  as a high school junior but earned all-state honors as a football quarterback and averaged 30 points per game in basketball nonetheless. On the baseball field, he played shortstop and pitched. He received scholarship offers to play all three sports collegiately but most strongly considered a scholarship offer to play college baseball and walk on to the basketball team at the University of Arkansas.

Professional career

Early minor league career 
Drafted in the sixth round in June 1988, Mahomes began his professional career with the Elizabethton Twins that same year as a starting pitcher.

Minnesota Twins 
 Mahomes made his major league debut with the Twins in 1992. He made the team out of spring training, and started the sixth game of the season, on April 12 against the Texas Rangers, pitching six innings and getting a no decision. He notched his first major league win in his next start, on April 21 against the Seattle Mariners. Mahomes played with the Twins into the 1996 season, appearing in a total of 114 games (51 starts) during five seasons while compiling an 18–28 record with 5.82 ERA, with 217 strikeouts in  innings. The Twins traded Mahomes to the Red Sox on August 26, 1996, in exchange for a player to be named later (which turned out to be pitcher Brian Looney).

Boston Red Sox 
Mahomes pitched a total of 21 games (all in relief) during the 1996 and 1997 seasons with Boston, registering a 6.85 ERA with 3–0 record and 11 strikeouts in  innings. He was released by the Red Sox on June 27, 1997.

Yokohama BayStars 
Mahomes played for the Yokohama BayStars of Nippon Pro Baseball, signing with them midway through the 1997 season, and pitched with them through 1998.

New York Mets 
Mahomes was signed by the Mets in December 1998. He went 8–0 in the 1999 season during 39 relief appearances, and helped the Mets reach the playoffs. Mahomes made four relief appearances during the postseason, recording a 2.25 ERA in eight innings pitched while striking out four, as the Mets lost to the Atlanta Braves in the NLCS. In 2000, Mahomes was 5–3 in 53 appearances (five starts), and while the Mets reached the 2000 World Series, Mahomes was left off the Mets' playoff roster. In his two seasons with the Mets, Mahomes appeared in 92 regular season games (five starts) with a 4.74 ERA, 13–3 record, and 127 strikeouts in  innings. He became a free agent in December 2000.

Texas Rangers 
Mahomes signed with the home state team Texas Rangers in January 2001. During the 2001 season, he appeared in 56 games (four starts) with a 5.70 ERA and 7–6 record, while striking out 61 in  innings. Mahomes again became a free agent in November 2001.

Chicago Cubs 
In January 2002, Mahomes signed with the Cubs. He made 16 appearances (two starts) during the 2002 season, with a 3.86 ERA and 1–1 record, striking out 23 in  innings. Mahomes became a free agent in October 2002.

Pittsburgh Pirates 
Mahomes was signed by Pittsburgh in January 2003. He made nine appearances (one start) with the Pirates during the 2003 season, recording an 0–1 record with 4.84 ERA and 13 strikeouts in  innings. This would prove to be his final season playing in MLB. Mahomes again became a free agent in September 2003.

Overall, Mahomes pitched 11 seasons in MLB, making a total of 308 regular season appearances (63 starts) with a 42–39 record, 5.47 ERA, and 452 strikeouts in 709 innings pitched. He had 43 at bats during his career, with 11 hits (.256 batting average) and four RBIs.

Minor league journeyman 
In , Mahomes pitched primarily for the Pittsburgh Pirates AAA affiliate, the Nashville Sounds, while appearing in nine games for the Pirates. In , he split the season between three organizations, pitching for the Edmonton Trappers in the Montreal Expos farm system, the Albuquerque Isotopes in the Florida Marlins system, and then again at Nashville at the end of the season.

After spending  with the Las Vegas 51s in the Los Angeles Dodgers organization, Mahomes turned to the independent leagues, starting  with the Long Island Ducks of the Atlantic League. After going 11–4 with a 3.87 ERA, he signed with Kansas City Royals in August, but was released a month later.

Mahomes began the 2007 season with the Sioux Falls Canaries of the American Association. On August 24, the Toronto Blue Jays signed him, and he appeared in three games for the Syracuse Chiefs before becoming a free agent at the end of the season. He split the 2009 season between Sioux Falls and Grand Prairie.

In 2019, Mahomes was inducted to the Sioux Falls Canaries Hall of Fame.

Personal life
Mahomes has two sons with his now ex-wife: Patrick II, who is a quarterback for the Kansas City Chiefs, and Jackson, who is a social media influencer. Patrick II goes by Patrick to avoid being confused with his father.

References

External links
, or Retrosheet, or Baseball Reference (Independent, Japanese and Minor leagues)
Pura Pelota (Venezuelan Winter League)

1970 births
Living people
African-American baseball players
Albuquerque Isotopes players
American expatriate baseball players in Canada
American expatriate baseball players in Japan
Baseball players from Texas
Boston Red Sox players
Caribes de Oriente players
Chicago Cubs players
Edmonton Trappers players
Elizabethton Twins players
Grand Prairie AirHogs players
Iowa Cubs players
Kenosha Twins players
Las Vegas 51s players
Long Island Ducks players
Major League Baseball pitchers
Minnesota Twins players
Nashville Sounds players
Navegantes del Magallanes players
American expatriate baseball players in Venezuela
New York Mets players
Norfolk Tides players
Omaha Royals players
Orlando Sun Rays players
Pawtucket Red Sox players
People from Bryan, Texas
Pittsburgh Pirates players
Portland Beavers players
Salt Lake Buzz players
Sioux Falls Canaries players
Southern Maryland Blue Crabs players
Syracuse Chiefs players
Texas Rangers players
Tiburones de La Guaira players
Visalia Oaks players
Yokohama BayStars players
21st-century African-American sportspeople
20th-century African-American sportspeople